The 1932 Montana gubernatorial election took place on November 8, 1932. Incumbent Governor of Montana John E. Erickson, who was first elected governor in 1924 and was re-elected in 1928, ran for re-election. He won the Democratic primary with a plurality and advanced to the general election, where he faced Frank A. Hazelbaker, the Lieutenant Governor of Montana. Despite the fact that Franklin D. Roosevelt carried the state in a landslide in the presidential election that year, Erickson only narrowly defeated Hazelbaker to win re-election to his third and final term as governor, though he would later resign just a few months into his term to appoint himself to the United States Senate.

Democratic primary

Candidates
John E. Erickson, incumbent Governor of Montana
Lewis Penwell, Collector of Internal Revenue for the District of Montana, former State Representative
Miles Romney Sr., former State Senator, former Mayor of Hamilton
Henry B. Mitchell

Results

Republican primary

Candidates
Frank A. Hazelbaker, Lieutenant Governor of Montana
W. S. McCormack, former President of the Montana Senate

Results

General election

Results

References

Montana
Gubernatorial
1932
November 1932 events in the United States